Maraveneh-ye Seh (also Romanized as Marāvaneh-ye Seh; also known as Al Marā‘ūneh, Almarāveneh-ye Yek, Almarāvīyeh, Almarāyeneh, Marā‘ūneh, and Marāveneh) is a village in Anaqcheh Rural District, in the Central District of Ahvaz County, Khuzestan Province, Iran. At the 2006 census, its population was 121, in 28 families.

References 

Populated places in Ahvaz County